Gillespie County Airport  is in and owned by Gillespie County, Texas; it is three miles southwest of Fredericksburg, Texas. The National Plan of Integrated Airport Systems for 2011–2015 categorized it as a general aviation facility.

Facilities
Gillespie County Airport covers 216 acres (87 ha) at an elevation of 1,695 feet (517 m). Its runway (14/32) is 5,001 by 75 feet (1,524 x 23 m) asphalt.

In the year ending August 5, 2011 the airport had 15,675 aircraft operations, average 42 per day: 98% general aviation, 1% air taxi, and 1% military. 61 aircraft were then based at this airport: 82% single-engine, 13% multi-engine, 3% helicopter, and 2% jet.

See also 
 List of airports in Texas

References

External links 
 
 

Airports in Texas
Transportation in Gillespie County, Texas
Buildings and structures in Gillespie County, Texas